Mathew Cheriankunnel (23 September 1930 – 30 March 2022) was an Indian Roman Catholic prelate, who served as a bishop of the Roman Catholic Diocese of Kurnool.

Biography 
Born on 23 September 1930 in Kadayanicad, British Raj, he was ordained priest of the Pontifical Institute for Foreign Missions on 28 April 1962. He was appointed the first bishop of Nalgonda on 31 May 1976, and received his episcopal consecration on 3 May 1977, from Cardinal Duraisamy Simon Lourdusamy. He was appointed coadjutor bishop of Catholic Diocese of Kurnool on 22 December 1986, succeeding on 18 January 1988. He left the diocese government on 16 July 1991. Cheriankunnel died on 30 March 2022, at the age of 91.;

References

External links
 Profile of Mons. Cheriankunnel www.catholic-hierarchy.org 

·

1930 births
2022 deaths
People from Kurnool
20th-century Roman Catholic bishops in India